Spencer Bell may refer to:
 Spencer Bell (actor) (1887–1935), American actor and comedian
 J. Spencer Bell (1906–1967), American federal judge
 James Spencer-Bell (1818–1872), British MP